Metro Light Rail may refer to:

 Valley Metro Rail, the light rail network in Phoenix, Arizona
 Metro Light Rail, a former name for the Inner West Light Rail in Sydney
 Dubai Metro previously known as the Dubai Light Rail Transport DLRT
 METRORail, a light rail line in Houston, Texas